John Edward Weston Kirby (born 4 February 1936) is an English former first-class cricketer.

Kirby was born in February 1936 at Low Fell, County Durham. He was educated at Ampleforth College, before going up to Corpus Christi College, Oxford. While studying at Oxford, he made three appearances in first-class cricket for Oxford University in 1956, against the Free Foresters, Nottinghamshire and Sussex. He scored 78 runs in his three matches, with a high score of 28.

References

External links

1936 births
Living people
Alumni of Corpus Christi College, Oxford
Cricketers from Gateshead
English cricketers
Oxford University cricketers
People educated at Ampleforth College